Hermann Dvoracek (born 4 May 1920) is an Austrian former footballer.

References

1920 births
Possibly living people
Association football forwards
Austrian footballers
SK Rapid Wien players
FK Austria Wien players
First Vienna FC players